Bayazid Baz Bahadur Khan was the last Sultan of Malwa Sultanate, who reigned from 1555 to 1562. He succeeded his father, Shuja'at Khan. He is known for his romantic liaison with Roopmati.

Baz Bahadur as sultan did not bother to look after his kingdom nor did he maintain a strong army, being devoted to the arts and to his paramour. He fell in love with the beautiful Hindu shepherdess called Roopmati and also build the Rewa Kund which is a reservoir built by Baz Bahadur at Mandu, equipped with an aqueduct to The Narmada.  Mughals defeated him and captured his Hindu queen Roopmati, who killed herself at this turn of events.

In 1561, Akbar's army led by Adham Khan and Pir Muhammad Khan attacked Malwa and defeated Baz Bahadur in the battle of Sarangpur on 29 March 1561. One of the reasons for Adham Khan's attack seems to be his lust for Rani Roopmati. Rani Roopmati poisoned herself upon hearing of the fall of Mandu. Baz Bahadur fled to Khandesh. Akbar soon recalled Adham Khan and made over command to Pir Muhammad, who attacked Khandesh and proceeded up to Burhanpur but was soon defeated by a coalition of three powers: Miran Mubarak Shah II of Khandesh, Tufal Khan of Berar and Baz Bahadur. Pir Muhammad died while retreating. The confederate army pursued the Mughals and drove them out of Malwa, and thus Baz Bahadur regained his kingdom for a brief period. In 1562, Akbar sent another army led by Abdullah Khan which finally defeated Baz Bahadur, who fled to Chittor. Malwa was absorbed by the Mughals, with Baz Bahadur becoming a fugitive at various courts for a number of years. In November 1570, he surrendered to Akbar at Agra and joined his service.

Bahadur's capital was Mandu (now in Madhya Pradesh), which then became an important city in the Mughal Empire. The Jahaz Mahal is located in Mandu.

References 

History of Malwa
People from Dhar
16th-century Indian monarchs
16th-century Indian Muslims